The 1937 German football championship, the 30th edition of the competition, was won by Schalke 04, the club's third German championship, by defeating 1. FC Nürnberg 2–0 in the final. For Schalke it was the half-way point of the club's most successful era, having won the 1934, 1935 final before the 1937 title and going on to win the 1939, 1940 and 1942 ones as well, winning six national championships all up during this time. 1. FC Nürnberg, the defending champions who had eliminated Schalke in the semi-finals in the previous season, already had six titles to their name at the time and would go on to win three more between 1948 and 1968 for a total of nine. The two clubs, Germany's most successful teams in the pre-Bundesliga era, had previously met in the 1934 final which Schalke had won 2–1 but would never encounter each other again in a championship final after 1937.

Karl Mayer of SV Werder Bremen and Ernst Kalwitzki of FC Schalke 04 where the joint top scorers of the 1937 championship with ten goals each. Kalwitzki would finish as the competition's top scorer twice more, in 1939 and 1943.

It was the first-ever German championship final to be played in the Olympiastadion in Berlin, build for the 1936 Summer Olympics.

FC Schalke 04 completed the 1936–37 season unbeaten, finishing the Gauliga Westfalen with 17 wins and one draw. The club than went on to win seven out of eight games in the championship and draw one, against SV Werder Bremen, to complete the league season with a record of 24 wins and two draws. After the German championship win Schalke went on to win the 1937 Tschammerpokal, the German Cup as well, by defeating Fortuna Düsseldorf 2–1 in the final.

The sixteen 1936–37 Gauliga champions competed in a group stage of four groups of four teams each, with the group winners advancing to the semi-finals. The two semi-final winners then contested the 1937 championship final.

Qualified teams
The teams qualified through the 1936–37 Gauliga season:

Competition

Group 1
Group 1 was contested by the champions of the Gauligas Nordmark, Ostpreußen, Sachsen and Schlesien:

Group 2
Group 2 was contested by the champions of the Gauligas Brandenburg, Niedersachsen, Pommern and Westfalen:

Group 3
Group 3 was contested by the champions of the Gauligas Hessen, Mitte, Südwest and Württemberg:

Group 4
Group 4 was contested by the champions of the Gauligas Bayern, Baden, Mittelrhein and Niederrhein:

Semi-finals

|align="center" style="background:#ddffdd" colspan=3|6 June 1937

|}

Third place play-off

|align="center" style="background:#ddffdd" colspan=3|20 June 1937

|}

Final

|align="center" style="background:#ddffdd" colspan=3|20 June 1937

|}

References

Sources
 kicker Allmanach 1990, by kicker, page 164 & 177 - German championship

External links
 German Championship 1936–37 at weltfussball.de 
 German Championship 1937 at RSSSF

1
German
German football championship seasons